Taseqite is a rare mineral of the eudialyte group, with chemical formula . The formula given is derived from the original one and shows a separate silicon at the M4 site, basing on the nomenclature of the eudialyte group. Taseqite, khomyakovite and manganokhomyakovite are three group representatives with species-defining strontium, although many other members display strontium diadochy. Both strontium (N4Sr) and niobium (M3Nb) are essential in the crystal structure of taseqite. When compared to khomyakovite, taseqite differs in niobium- and chlorine-dominance.

Occurrence and association
Taseqite's type locality is the Taseq slope located in the Ilimaussaq complex, Greenland - hence its name. At the type locality taseqite occurs in albitite veins, together with aegirine, analcime, catapleiite, ferrobustamite, hemimorphite, pectolite (silicates);  ancylite-(La), calcite, dolomite, strontianite (carbonates); fluorapatite, and sphalerite. Taseqite was found also in Odichincha massif in association with nepheline, alkaline feldspar, aegerine and lamprophyllite.

Notes on chemistry
Admixtures in taseqite include potassium and manganese, with traces of yttrium, cerium, hafnium, tantalum, and tin.

The Raman spectra 
The Raman spectra of taseqite have features characteristic of other representatives of the eudialyte group. The most complex structure is observed in the range of 100–1200 cm−1. Pronounced peaks are observed at 127 cm−1 (this peak is also present in the spectra of eudialyte and golyshevite) and 190 cm−1; bands at close (but somewhat higher) frequencies were observed in the Raman spectra of eudialyte, manganoeudialyte, golyshevite, ferrokentbrooksite, and aqualite (at 205–207 cm−1) and in the spectra of georgbarsanovite and raslakite (at 213–217 cm−1). Thus, it is reasonable to suggest that the bands at 127 and 190 cm−1 are due to Na–O and Sr–O stretching vibrations, respectively. A superposition of bands of different widths is observed for taseqite in the range of 250–350 cm−1; the intensities of these bands depend strongly on the orientation of the plane of polarization. The band at 270 cm−1 is comparable with that of the band at 272 cm−1, which manifests itself as a peak in the spectrum of aqualite and as a shoulder in the georgbarsanovite spectrum; however, it is absent in the spectra of the other members of the eudialyte group. Other strong bands are observed at 285 and 310–326 cm−1 (the latter group can be put into correspondence with the strong peak observed in the golyshevite and georgbarsanovite spectra). All these bands, having a preferred polarization along the c axis, are most likely due to the out-of-plane bending vibrations of silicon‒oxygen rings. The weaker band at 387 cm−1 coincides with wide peaks in the oneillite and eudialyte spectra, it is observed as a weak peak in the georgbarsanovite spectrum.

In the range of 530–590 cm−1, there is a strong band of complex shape, peaking at 560 cm−1 and having shoulders at 527 and 540 cm−1. The band at 560 cm−1 was interpreted as a manifestation of the vibrations of (SiO3)n rings, although the vibrations of Zr–O and Fe–O bonds can also be involved.

The characteristic peak at 605 cm−1 is comparable with the maximum at 612 cm−1 in the Raman spectrum of golyshevite. The wide peak in the vicinity of 700 cm−1 can be compared with that observed at 700–710 cm−1 in the spectra of almost all EGMs, except for aqualite. The absorption peak at 740 cm−1 is typical of many minerals, including oneillite and eudialyte; it is shifted in the spectra of golyshevite (747 cm−1) and georgbarsanovite (751 cm−1). The similar band in the IR spectra of EGMs is due to the bending vibrations of silicon‒oxygen rings, in which electric dipole moment oscillates mainly along the c axis [1]. This is confirmed by the preferred polarization of the Raman band at 740 cm−1 in the direction perpendicular to the c axis.

The frequency range  900–1150 cm−1, corresponds to the Si–O stretching vibrations. The Raman spectrum of taseqite contains a complex band at 930 cm−1 with a shoulder at 900 cm−1 in this range. The bands in the ranges of 1000–1030 and 1070–1130 cm−1, which are due to the vibrations of silicon‒oxygen rings, are assigned to the stretching vibrations of apical Si–O bonds and Si–O–Si bridges, respectively. The region of O–H stretching vibrations contains a weak peak of complex shape at 3632 cm−1, with shoulders at 3660 and 3670 cm−1, and a wide band in the range of 3400–3550 cm−1, which is due to the water molecules forming relatively strong hydrogen bonds.

References

Cyclosilicates
Sodium minerals
Strontium minerals
Calcium minerals
Iron minerals
Zirconium minerals
Niobium minerals
Trigonal minerals
Minerals in space group 160
Minerals described in 2004